Olajumoke Bodunrin (born 7 February 1945) is a retired Nigerian sprinter. Regarded as "Africa's fastest woman" during her career, Olajumoke claimed gold at the 1965 All-Africa Games in Brazzaville, Congo before going on to represent Nigeria at the 1968 Summer Olympics in Mexico.

References

1945 births
Living people
Nigerian female sprinters
Athletes (track and field) at the 1968 Summer Olympics
People from Ogun State
Olympic athletes of Nigeria
Commonwealth Games competitors for Nigeria
Athletes (track and field) at the 1966 British Empire and Commonwealth Games
Athletes (track and field) at the 1970 British Commonwealth Games
African Games gold medalists for Nigeria
African Games medalists in athletics (track and field)
Athletes (track and field) at the 1965 All-Africa Games
Yoruba sportswomen
Olympic female sprinters
20th-century Nigerian women